Deraney is a surname. Notable people with the surname include:

Bob Deraney (born 1966), American ice hockey coach
John Deraney (born 1983), American football punter

See also
Delaney (disambiguation)